The Central District of Rumeshkhan County is a district (bakhsh) in Rumeshkhan County, Lorestan Province, Iran. At the 2006 census, it had 19,333 inhabitants, living in 4,070 households.  The district has one city Chaqabol, with 25% of the population.  The District contains two rural districts: Bazvand Rural District, and Rumeshkhan Rural District, with a total of thirteen villages.

References 

Districts of Lorestan Province
Rumeshkhan County